Franklin College-Old Main is a historic academic building located on the campus of Franklin College in Franklin, Johnson County, Indiana. The building consists of three sections: the north wing constructed in 1847, the south wing constructed in 1855, and the middle section connecting the two wings in 1888  The wings are each three stories tall, while the middle section is four stories and topped by a bell tower and observatory.  The building is in a Late Victorian / Gothic style.

It was listed on the National Register of Historic Places in 1975.

References

University and college buildings on the National Register of Historic Places in Indiana
University and college administration buildings in the United States
Gothic Revival architecture in Indiana
Victorian architecture in Indiana
School buildings completed in 1888
Buildings and structures in Johnson County, Indiana
National Register of Historic Places in Johnson County, Indiana